Anais Mokngar Mali (born 22 January 1991) is a French model. She has modeled and walked the runway for top fashion brands such Marc Jacobs, Vera Wang and Derek Lam.

Early life
Mali was born in Toulon, France, to a mother from Chad and a Polish father.

Career

In 2009, she signed with Wilhelmina Models.

In July 2010, style.it featured Mali and proclaimed her as "a face to watch."

In 2010 she left Wilhelmina Models and signed with Ford Models. In December 2010, she appeared in an Interview editorial alongside Melodie Monrose.

In January 2011, she appeared in an Italian Vogue editorial photographed by Steven Meisel. In February 2011, she appeared in a Vogue editorial, photographed by Mario Testino. In May 2011, she appeared in editorials for Harper's Bazaar, American, French, and Italian Vogue, V, and i-D, photographed by Richard Bush.

In June 2016, she appeared in a Vogue Nippon editorial titled "Anais Goes Glam", shot by Giampaolo Sgura. In November 2016, she appeared in The Weeknd's video Mania. The next year she collaborated with designer Urivaldo Lopes to develop and launch a line of bodysuits under the label Anaïs Bodysuits.

Select modeling appearances 

 2009:  L.A.M.B., Sophie Theallet, Betsey Johnson, Shiatzy Chen, Vivienne Westwood
 2010: Catherine Malandrino, Cynthia Steffe, Rachel Roy, Walter shows, J.Crew, Zink,Marc Jacobs, Vera Wang, Derek Lam, Cynthia Rowley, and Carolina Herrera
 2011:  Victoria's Secret Fashion Show

References

External links 

 
 
 
 Anais Mali at Blackrunway.com

1991 births
Living people
French female models
Businesspeople from Toulon
French people of Polish descent
French people of Chadian descent
French expatriates in the United States
Next Management models